The Casius quadrangle is one of a series of 30 quadrangle maps of Mars used by the United States Geological Survey (USGS) Astrogeology Research Program. The quadrangle is located in the north-central portion of Mars’ eastern hemisphere and covers 60° to 120° east longitude (240° to 300° west longitude) and 30° to 65° north latitude. The quadrangle uses a Lambert conformal conic projection at a nominal scale of 1:5,000,000 (1:5M). The Casius quadrangle is also referred to as MC-6 (Mars Chart-6).  Casius quadrangle contains part of Utopia Planitia and a small part of Terra Sabaea.
The southern and northern borders of the Casius quadrangle are approximately 3,065 km and 1,500 km wide, respectively. The north to south distance is about 2,050 km (slightly less than the length of Greenland). The quadrangle covers an approximate area of 4.9 million square km, or a little over 3% of Mars’ surface area.

Origin of name
Casius is the name of a telescopic albedo feature located at 40° N and 100° E on Mars. The feature was named by Schiaparelli in 1888 after Mt Casius in Egypt, famous in antiquity for the nearby coastal marshes in which whole armies were reputed to have drowned. The name was approved by the International Astronomical Union (IAU) in 1958.

Physiography and geology
The high latitude Casius quadrangle bears several features that are believed to indicate the presence of ground ice.  Patterned ground is one such feature.  Usually, polygonal shapes are found poleward of 55 degrees latitude. Other features associated with ground ice are Scalloped Topography, Ring Mold Craters, and Concentric Crater Fill.

Polygonal patterned ground

Polygonal, patterned ground is quite common in some regions of Mars, especially in scalloped topography.   It is commonly believed to be caused by the sublimation of ice from the ground.  Sublimation is the direct change of solid ice to a gas.  This is similar to what happens to dry ice on the Earth.  Places on Mars that display polygonal ground may indicate where future colonists can find water ice.  Patterned ground forms in a mantle layer that fell from the sky when the climate was different.
Polygonal ground is generally divided into two kinds: high center and low center.  The middle of a high center polygon is 10 meters across and its troughs are 2–3 meters wide.  Low center polygons are 5–10 meters across and the boundary ridges are 3–4 meters wide.  Low center polygons have been proposed as a marker for ground ice.

Ring mold craters

Ring mold craters look like the ring molds used in baking.  They are believed to be caused by an impact into ice.  The ice is covered by a layer of debris.  They are found in parts of Mars that have buried ice.  Laboratory experiments confirm that impacts into ice result in a "ring mold shape." They may be an easy way for future colonists of Mars to find water ice.

Concentric crater fill
Concentric crater fill is when the floor of a crater is mostly covered with a large number of parallel ridges.  They are thought to result from a glacial type of movement.  Sometimes boulders are found on concentric crater fill; it is believed they fell off crater wall, and then were transported away from the wall with the movement of the glacier. Erratics on Earth were carried by similar means.  Based on accurate topography measures of height at different points in these craters and calculations of how deep the craters should be based on their diameters, it is thought that the craters are 80% filled with mostly ice. That is, they hold hundreds of meters of material that probably consists of ice with a few tens of meters of surface debris.  The ice accumulated in the crater from snowfall in previous climates.

High resolution pictures taken with HiRISE reveal that some of the surfaces of concentric crater fill are covered with strange patterns called closed-cell and open-cell brain terrain.  The terrain resembles a human brain.  It is believed to be caused by cracks in the surface accumulating dust and other debris, together with ice sublimating from some of the surfaces.

Glaciers

Old glaciers are found in many places on Mars.  Some are associated with gullies.

Nilosyrtis
Nilosyrtis runs from about 280 to 304 degrees west longitude, so like several other features, it sits in more than one quadrangle.  Part of Nilosyrtis is in the Ismenius Lacus quadrangle, the rest is in Casius quadrangle.

Climate change caused ice-rich features
Many features on Mars, including many in Casius quadrangle, are believed to contain large amounts of ice.  The most popular model for the origin of the ice is climate change from large changes in the tilt of the planet's rotational axis.  At times the tilt has even been greater than 80 degrees   Large changes in the tilt explains many ice-rich features on Mars.

Studies have shown that when the tilt of Mars reaches 45 degrees from its current 25 degrees, ice is no longer stable at the poles.   Furthermore, at this high tilt, stores of solid carbon dioxide (dry ice) sublimate, thereby increasing the atmospheric pressure.  This increased pressure allows more dust to be held in the atmosphere.  Moisture in the atmosphere will fall as snow or as ice frozen onto dust grains.  Calculations suggest this material will concentrate in the mid-latitudes.  General circulation models of the Martian atmosphere predict accumulations of ice-rich dust in the same areas where ice-rich features are found.  
When the tilt begins to return to lower values, the ice sublimates (turns directly to a gas) and leaves behind a lag of dust.   The lag deposit caps the underlying material so with each cycle of high tilt levels, some ice-rich mantle remains behind.   Note, that the smooth surface mantle layer probably represents only relative recent material.

Mars Science Laboratory 
Nilosyrtis is one of the sites proposed as a landing site for the Mars Science Laboratory.  However, it did not make the final cut.  It was in the top 7, but not in the top 4.
The aim of the Mars Science Laboratory is to search for signs of ancient life.  It is hoped that a later mission could then return samples from sites identified as probably containing remains of life.  To safely bring the craft down, a 12-mile-wide, smooth, flat circle is needed.  Geologists hope to examine places where water once ponded.  They would like to examine sediment layers.

Layers
Many places on Mars show rocks arranged in layers. A detailed discussion of layering with many Martian examples can be found in Sedimentary Geology of Mars.  Rock can form layers in a variety of ways.  Volcanoes, wind, or water can produce layers.  Layers may be formed by groundwater rising up depositing minerals and cementing sediments.  The hardened layers are consequently more protected from erosion.  This process may occur instead of layers forming under lakes.

Gullies
Martian gullies are small, incised networks of narrow channels and their associated downslope sediment deposits, found on the planet of Mars. They are named for their resemblance to terrestrial gullies. First discovered on images from Mars Global Surveyor, they occur on steep slopes, especially on the walls of craters. Usually, each gully has a dendritic alcove at its head, a fan-shaped apron at its base, and a single thread of incised channel linking the two, giving the whole gully an hourglass shape. They are believed to be relatively young because they have few, if any craters. A subclass of gullies is also found cut into the faces of sand dunes which themselves considered to be quite young. 
On the basis of their form, aspects, positions, and location amongst and apparent interaction with features thought to be rich in water ice, many researchers believed that the processes carving the gullies involve liquid water. However, this remains a topic of active research.  
As soon as gullies were discovered, researchers began to image many gullies over and over, looking for possible changes.  By 2006, some changes were found.  Later, with further analysis it was determined that the changes could have occurred by dry granular flows rather than being driven by flowing water. With continued observations many more changes were found  in Gasa Crater and others.  
With more repeated observations, more and more changes have been found; since the changes occur in the winter and spring, experts are tending to believe that gullies were formed from dry ice. Before-and-after images demonstrated the timing of this activity coincided with seasonal carbon-dioxide frost and temperatures that would not have allowed for liquid water.  When dry ice frost changes to a gas, it may lubricate dry material to flow especially on steep slopes.  In some years frost, perhaps as thick as 1 meter.

Pedestal craters
A pedestal crater is a crater with its ejecta sitting above the surrounding terrain and thereby forming a raised platform (like a pedestal). They form when an impact crater ejects material which forms an erosion-resistant layer, thus causing the immediate area to erode more slowly than the rest of the region. Some pedestals have been accurately measured to be hundreds of meters above the surrounding area. This means that hundreds of meters of material were eroded away. The result is that both the crater and its ejecta blanket stand above the surroundings. Pedestal craters were first observed during the Mariner missions.

Cones
Some locations on Mars display a large number of cones.  Many have pits at the top.  There have been a number of ideas put forth as to their origins.  Some are in the Casius quadrangle like the ones below.

Linear ridge networks
Linear ridge networks are found in various places on Mars in and around craters.   Ridges often appear as mostly straight segments that intersect in a lattice-like manner.  They are hundreds of meters long, tens of meters high, and several meters wide.  It is thought that impacts created fractures in the surface, these fractures later acted as channels for fluids.  Fluids cemented the structures.  With the passage of time, surrounding material was eroded away, thereby leaving hard ridges behind.   
Since the ridges occur in locations with clay, these formations could serve as a marker for clay which requires water for its formation.

Scalloped terrain
Scalloped depressions are believed to form from the removal of subsurface material, possibly interstitial ice, by sublimation (direct transition of a material from the solid to the gas phase with no intermediate liquid stage). This process may still be happening at present.  This topography may be of great importance for future colonization of Mars because it may point to deposits of pure ice.

On November 22, 2016, NASA reported finding a large amount of underground ice in the Utopia Planitia region of Mars. The volume of water detected has been estimated to be equivalent to the volume of water in Lake Superior.
The volume of water ice in the region were based on measurements from the ground-penetrating radar instrument on Mars Reconnaissance Orbiter, called SHARAD.  From the data obtained from SHARAD, “dielectric permittivity”, or the dielectric constant was determined. The dielectric constant value was consistent with a large concentration of water ice.

Layers in craters

Layers along slopes, especially along crater walls are believed to be the remains of a once wide spread material that has mostly been eroded away.

Dipping layers
Dipping layers are common in some regions of Mars.  They may be the remains of mantle layers.

Craters

Impact craters generally have a rim with ejecta around them, in contrast volcanic craters usually do not have a rim or ejecta deposits.  As craters get larger (greater than 10 km in diameter) they usually have a central peak. The peak is caused by a rebound of the crater floor following the impact.   If one measures the diameter of a crater, the original depth can be estimated with various ratios.  Because of this relationship, researchers have found that many Martian craters contain a great deal of material; much of it is believed to be ice deposited when the climate was different. Sometimes craters expose layers that were buried.   Rocks from deep underground are tossed onto the surface.  Hence, craters can show us what lies deep under the surface.

Dust devil tracks
Many areas on Mars experience the passage of giant dust devils. These dust devils leave tracks on the surface of mars because they disturb a thin coating of fine bright dust that covers most of the Martian surface. When a dust devil goes by it blows away the coating and exposes the underlying dark surface. Within a few weeks, the dark track assumes its former bright colour, either by being re-covered through wind action or due to surface oxidation through exposure to sunlight and air.

Pitted surface

Other views from Casius

Other Mars quadrangles

Interactive Mars map

See also

 Climate of Mars
 Geology of Mars
 Patterned ground
 Water on Mars

References

External links 

   Martian Ice - Jim Secosky - 16th Annual International Mars Society Convention
 https://www.youtube.com/watch?v=kpnTh3qlObk[T. Gordon Wasilewski - Water on Mars - 20th Annual International Mars Society Convention]  Describes how to get water from ice in the ground

 
Mars